Thomas Claiborne (May 17, 1780 – January 7, 1856) was an American politician and a United States Representative for the state of Tennessee.

Early life and career
Son of Mary & Thomas B. Claiborne. He served as a major on the staff of Gen. Andrew Jackson in the Creek War. He studied law and was admitted to the bar and commenced practice in Nashville, Tennessee, in 1807. He owned slaves. As a member of Tennessee House of Representatives from 1811 to 1812, he was presiding as Speaker during the latter session. He served as a United States Marshal. Elected as a Democratic-Republican to the Fifteenth Congress, Claiborne served from March 4, 1817 to March 3, 1819. He also served as Mayor of Nashville in 1818.

Death
Claiborne died on January 7, 1856, at the age of 75 years, 235 days. He is interred at Nashville City Cemetery, Nashville, Tennessee.

Personal life
Claiborne represented Hiram Lodge No. 7 and Cumberland Lodge No. 8, of the Free and Accepted Masons, at the formation of the Grand Lodge of Tennessee on December 27, 1813. He was chosen Most Worshipful Grand Master of Tennessee from 1813 to 1814.  He resumed the practice of law in Nashville.

References

External links

1780 births
1856 deaths
People from Brunswick County, Virginia
Claiborne family
American people of English descent
Democratic-Republican Party members of the United States House of Representatives
Mayors of Nashville, Tennessee
Grand Masters of the Grand Lodge of Tennessee
Tennessee lawyers
American slave owners
19th-century American politicians
Burials in Tennessee